This is a list of seasons completed by the Edmonton Oilers professional ice hockey club. This list documents the records and playoff results of the Oilers' 49-year history in both the World Hockey Association (WHA) and later, the National Hockey League (NHL).

The Edmonton Oilers began as a charter member of the World Hockey Association (WHA) in 1972, and were known as the Alberta Oilers for their first season after their Calgary counterparts were unable to play. The Oilers were a middle of the road team, failing to win a single playoff series until their seventh, and final, season in the WHA. In that last year, the Oilers lost to the (Jets) in the last Avco World Trophy final.

In 1979, the Oilers, along with the Jets, the Hartford Whalers and the Quebec Nordiques joined the NHL following the dissolution of the WHA. They would quickly find success, first by shocking the Montreal Canadiens in 1980–81, then by finishing atop the Smythe Division each of the next five years. After falling to the New York Islanders in their first Stanley Cup final in 1982–83, the Oilers would achieve what is generally regarded as the last dynasty in NHL history by capturing five Stanley Cups in seven years between 1984 and 1990.

The Oilers have not since been able to duplicate that level of success since, however, they did capture their seventh Conference title in 2005–06. Their run took them to the seventh game of the Stanley Cup Finals, which they lost to the Carolina Hurricanes.

WHA (1972–79)

Note: GP = Games played, W = Wins, L = Losses, T = Ties, Pts = Points, GF = Goals for, GA = Goals against, PIM = Penalties in minutes

NHL (1979–present)

Table key

Year by year

1 From the 1981–82 season to the 1992–93 season the team only recognizes playoff division championships.
2 Season was shortened due to the 1994–95 NHL lockout.
3 Season was cancelled due to the 2004–05 NHL lockout.
4 As of the 2005–06 NHL season, all games tied after overtime will be decided in a shootout; SOL (Shootout losses) will be recorded as OTL in the standings.
5 Season was shortened due to the 2012–13 NHL lockout.
6 Season was suspended on March 12, 2020 due to the COVID-19 pandemic.
7 Season was shortened due to the COVID-19 pandemic.

All-time NHL records

References

External links
WHA (1972–73): 1972–73 Alberta Oilers @ hockeydb.com
WHA (1973–79): 1973–79 Edmonton Oilers @ hockeydb.com
NHL (1979–present): 1979–present Edmonton Oilers @ hockeydb.com

 
National Hockey League team seasons
seasons
Edmonton Oilers